Alexander Gazsi (born 6 October 1984) is a German ice dancer. With partner Nelli Zhiganshina, he is a six-time German national champion (2007, 2011–2015) and has won twelve international medals. They have placed as high as 6th at the European Championships and 10th at the World Championships.

Personal life 
Alexander Gazsi was born on 6 October 1984 in Chemnitz, East Germany. His mother is a German from Kazakhstan and his father is Hungarian. He is in the sports division of the German army.

Career

Early years 
Gazsi began skating in 1988 at the age of four. The kids in his kindergarten class in East Germany were tested in various sports and he was chosen for the first one tested, figure skating. He switched from singles to ice dancing at age seven.

Early in his career, Gazsi skated with Mandy Kästner and Julia Novikov. By 2003, he was competing with Sandra Gissmann. They appeared four times on the ISU Junior Grand Prix series and placed 17th at the 2004 World Junior Championships.

Partnership with Nelli Zhiganshina

2005–2010 
In June 2005, Gazsi had a successful tryout with Nelli Zhiganshina in Moscow. At the start of their partnership, they trained mainly in Moscow with coaches Elena Kustarova and Svetlana Alexeeva and, during summers, in Berlin and Chemnitz due to Gazsi's army service. They later changed coaches to Alexander Zhulin and Oleg Volkov, also in Moscow.

Zhiganshina/Gazsi won bronze at their first German Championships in 2006, their only competition of the season. The next season they won their first national title, placed 16th at the 2007 Europeans and 18th at Worlds.

During the 2007–08 season, they made their debut on the Grand Prix circuit, placing 7th at Skate Canada and 8th at Cup of Russia. They won silver at German Nationals and again finished 18th at Worlds.

During the 2008–09 season, Zhiganshina/Gazsi did not compete on the Grand Prix circuit. Zhiganshina continued to visit Germany on a three-month tourist visa because the low income from the sport meant she did not qualify for residency and Germany did not have as high caliber ice dancers as Moscow to train alongside. Although favored to win 2009 German Nationals, they placed second and missed the European and World teams. They considered leaving competition to focus on show skating and worked with circus acrobats in Moscow but decided to continue their competitive career and moved to Oberstdorf, Germany in spring 2009 to work with coaches Rostislav Sinicyn and Martin Skotnicky. During the 2009–10 season, they placed third at German Nationals and were not sent to the European or World Championships. They were not eligible for the 2010 Winter Olympics due to Zhiganshina not having German citizenship.

2010–present 

During the 2010–11 season, Zhiganshina/Gazsi again received no Grand Prix invitations but won three medals at senior B events. They won their second national title and were selected to compete at the European Championships for the first time in three years. At Europeans, they were 8th in the short dance, then edged past Nóra Hoffmann / Maxim Zavozin by 0.39 points into 7th place overall after the free dance. This was the first top-ten result for German ice dancers since 2003 (Kati Winkler / Rene Lohse). The result gave Germany two berths to the 2012 European ice dancing event. Zhiganshina/Gazsi finished 11th at the 2011 World Championships, earning invitations to two Grand Prix events the following season.

In preparation for the 2011–12 season, Zhiganshina/Gazsi went to Sofia, Bulgaria, to work with choreographer Maxim Staviski, with whom they also worked in previous years. They began their season at the 2011 Nebelhorn Trophy where they won the silver medal. After placing fourth at both of their Grand Prix events, the 2011 Skate America and 2011 NHK Trophy, the duo finished eighth at the 2012 European Championships and eleventh at the 2012 World Championships.

In 2012–13, Zhiganshina/Gazsi placed a career-best sixth at the 2013 European Championships and tenth at the 2013 World Championships. As a result of their Worlds placement, Germany qualified two spots in ice dancing at the 2014 Olympics.

In 2013–14, Zhiganshina/Gazsi won their fifth national title and were selected to represent Germany at the 2014 Winter Olympics in Sochi. Germany assigned them to the team event short dance, where they placed sixth; Germany, however, did not qualify for the free dance. Zhiganshina/Gazsi finished 11th in the separate ice dancing event.

Programs

With Zhiganshina

With Gissmann

Competitive highlights 
GP: Grand Prix; CS: Challenger Series (began in the 2014–15 season); JGP: Junior Grand Prix

With Zhiganshina

With Gissmann

References

External links 

 
 
 
 
 

1984 births
Living people
German male ice dancers
Sportspeople from Chemnitz
Figure skaters at the 2014 Winter Olympics
Olympic figure skaters of Germany
German people of Hungarian descent